Permissions may refer to:

Law

 A license in copyright law, such as
 Music licensing, including performing rights for public performances, grand rights for theatrical performances, and sync licenses for audiovisual works

Technology

 Application permissions
 File system permissions